The Luisenkirche is a Protestant municipal and parish church in Charlottenburg, now part of Berlin, Germany. The building in Baroque style was begun in 1710, and around 100 years later named after Queen Luise of Prussia. Karl Friedrich Schinkel made suggestions for the addition of a steeple and interior changes in 1821, which were partly carried out from 1823. The Luisenkirche burnt in World War II and was rebuilt in the 1950s. A restoration in 1987/88 revived some of Schinkel's design.

History 
Charlottenburg, the location of the royal Schloss Charlottenburg, was made a town in 1705. The cornerstone of the church, the first church in town, was laid on 13 July 1712. King Frederick I of Prussia who had decreed to grant the citizens a church and finance it, said on the occasion: "Friedrich der Erste, König in Preußen, gewährt eine größere und eigene Stätte zur Abhaltung des Gottesdienstes und lässt diese Parochialkirche auf seine Kosten erbauen und für immer abwechselnd dem Kultus beider protestantischen Bekenntnisse geweiht sein." (Frederic I, King in Prussia, grants a larger and dedicated place to hold worship, and has this parish church built at his expense, and forever dedicated to the cult of both Protestant confessions [i.e. Lutheran and Reformed].)

The church was inaugurated on 12 July 1716 as the municipal and parish church by Michael Roloff of the Friedrichswerdersche Kirche in Berlin. The building has a floor of a Greek cross. It first had no steeple, but a little wooden ridge turret. In 1814, the turret was unstable and had to be removed. Karl Friedrich Schinkel made a suggestion in 1821 how to rebuild the church, with a steeple on a side. His plans were approved in 1823, but again in a simplified form. The steeple, which holds three bells, was inaugurated on 11 June 1826.

King Friedrich Wilhelm III gave permission to name the church after Queen Luise of Prussia who had died in 1810. It burnt during World War II in September 1943. The church was rebuilt between 1950 and 1956 by Hinnerk Scheper. In 1976, the exterior was restored. In 1987 and 1988, the interior was reconstructed according to Schinkel's plans by Jochen Langeheinecke. It was inaugurated again on 13 December 1987.

Literature

References

External links 

 
 Luisenkirche Landesdenkmalamt Berlin
 

Churches completed in 1716
1716 establishments in Prussia
Charlottenburg
United Protestant church buildings in Berlin
Louise of Mecklenburg-Strelitz
Frederick I of Prussia